Arun Maira (born 15 August 1943) is a management consultant and former member of Planning Commission of India. He is also a former Chairman of Boston Consulting Group, India.

Early life 
Arun Maira was born in Lahore. He received his M.Sc. and B.Sc. in physics from St Stephen's College, Delhi University.

Career 
Arun Maira was part of Tata Administrative Services for 25 years and held various positions in Tata Group until 1989.  Maira was board member of Tata Motors from 1981 to 1989 and played an instrumental role in Tata Motors's entry into the LCV segment. He then worked at Arthur D. Little for 10 years where he was Leader of Global Organisation Practice and managing director of Innovation Associates, a subsidiary of Arthur D. Little. Maira served as the chairman of Boston Consulting Group in India from 2000 to April 2008.
He was then appointed as a member of the Planning Commission of India in 2009. His focus here was on the development of strategies related to industrialisation and urbanisation.

Between 2000 and 2009, Arun Maira was on the boards of several companies which are listed below:

Maira has also served as chairman of Axis Bank Foundation and Save the Children, India. He was also a board member of the India Brand Equity Foundation, the Indian Institute of Corporate Affairs, and the UN Global Compact, and WWF India.

Bibliography 
Maira has authored several books on leadership and organisation, including

 Remaking India - One Country, One Destiny
 Discordant Democrats
 Shaping the Future: Aspirational Leadership in India and Beyond
 Transforming Capitalism - Business Leadership to Improve the World
 Redesigning the Aeroplane While Flying: Reforming Institutions

References

External links 
 Profile on Planning Commission homepage
 Arun Maira on JNNURM project
 

Indian management consultants
St. Stephen's College, Delhi alumni
Indian emigrants to the United States
Living people
1943 births
Businesspeople from Lahore
Members of the Planning Commission of India
American people of Indian descent
American businesspeople
20th-century Indian economists
XLRI – Xavier School of Management alumni